Sciaphylax is a genus of passerine birds in the family Thamnophilidae.

The genus contains two species:

 Southern chestnut-tailed antbird (Sciaphylax hemimelaena)
 Northern chestnut-tailed antbird (Sciaphylax castanea)

These species were formerly included in the genus Myrmeciza. A molecular phylogenetic study published in 2013 found that Myrmeciza was polyphyletic. In the resulting rearrangement to create monophyletic genera, the two chestnut-tailed antbirds was moved to a newly erected genus Sciaphylax. The type species is the southern chestnut-tailed antbird. The name of the new genus combines the Ancient Greek words skia "shadow" and phylax "a watcher".

References

 
 
Bird genera